Bebout is a surname. Notable people with the surname include:

Eli Bebout (born 1946), American politician
Nick Bebout (born 1951), American football player

French-language surnames